An Atom of time or "a-tom" (“indivisible” in Greek), refers to the smallest possible unit of time.

History 
One of the earliest occurrences of the word “atom” to mean the smallest possible unit of measuring time is found in the Greek text of the New Testament in Paul's . The text compares the length of time of the “atom” to the time needed for “the twinkling of an eye.” The text reads: “en atomo, en repe ophthamou” – the word "atom" is usually translated "a moment" - “In a moment, in the twinkling of an eye”. With that meaning it was later referred to in Medieval philosophical writings as the smallest possible division of time. The earliest known occurrence in English is in Byrhtferth's Enchiridion (a science text) of 1010–1012, where it was defined as 1/564 of a momentum (1½ minutes), and thus equal to almost 160 milliseconds. It was used in the computus, the calculation used to determine the calendar date of Easter.

References

Units of time

Philosophy of time